Sahand is a mountain peak in East Azerbaijan Province, Iran.

Sahand (Persian:سهند) may also refer to:

 Sahand, Iran, satellite city of Tabriz, East Azerbaijan Province, Iran
 Sahand Rural District, East Azerbaijan Province, Iran 
 Sahand Ski Resort, a ski resort in south east of Tabriz
 Sahand Stadium, a soccer stadium in Tabriz, Iran
 Sahand TV, a regional TV station in East Azerbaijan province of Iran
 Sahand University of Technology, a public technical university in East Azerbaijan Province, Iran
 Sahand-e Olya, a village in Zanjan Province, Iran
 Sahand-e Sofla, a village in Zanjan Province, Iran
 Iranian frigate Sahand (2012), a Moudge-class frigate
 IRIS Sahand (1969), a Mark V class frigate sunk in the Persian Gulf in 1988